Fly is the second EP released by rock band Sick Puppies. It was released in 2003 and features 6 tracks; including a remix by Josh Abrahams, an Enhanced CD featuring the making of the "Fly" music video and a rare version of the clip exclusive to the CD. It is the last release to feature Chris Mileski on drums.

Track listing

Personnel
Credits for Fly adapted from liner notes.
Sick Puppies
 Shim Moore - lead vocals, guitar
 Emma Anzai - bass, backing vocals
 Chris Mileski - drums

Production
 Peter Blyton - producer, mixing, programming
 Steve Francis - producer, mixing, programming
 Paul Stepanek - executive producer, management
 Don Bartley - mastering
 Anton Hagop & Scott Sandilands - studio assistants
 Josh Abrahams - programming and mixing on track 6

Artwork
Timo Rissanen - styling
Ahmed Salama - design & artwork
Dean Hammer - photography

References

Sick Puppies albums
2003 EPs